The traditional star name Deneb el Okab refers to two stars in the Aquila constellation:
 Epsilon Aquilae
 Zeta Aquilae

The name derives from the Arabic term ذنب العقاب  ðanab al-ʽuqāb meaning "the tail of the eagle".

See also
Deneb, α Cygni
Deneb (disambiguation)